Leopold of Austria may refer to:

 Leopold I, Margrave of Austria (died 994), reigned 976–94
 Leopold II, Margrave of Austria (1050–1095), reigned 1075–95
 Leopold III, Margrave of Austria (1073–1136), reigned 1095–1136, saint
 Leopold V, Duke of Austria (1157–1194)
 Leopold I, Duke of Austria (1290–1326), co-ruler of Austria from 1308 to 1326
 Leopold II, Duke of Austria (1328–1344), nominal co-ruler of Austria, died 1344
 Leopold of Austria (Bishop) (died 1557), Bishop of Córdoba
 Leopold V, Archduke of Austria (1586–1632), Regent of the Tyrol and Further Austria
 Archduke Leopold Salvator of Austria (1863–1931), son of Archduke Karl Salvator of Austria
 Archduke Leopold of Austria, Prince of Tuscany (1897–1958), second son of Archduke Leopold Salvator

See also 
 Duke Leopold (disambiguation)